Hinckley and Bosworth Borough Council elections are held every four years. Hinckley and Bosworth Borough Council is the local authority for the non-metropolitan district of Hinckley and Bosworth in Leicestershire, England. Since the last boundary changes in 2003, 34 councillors are elected from 16 wards.

Political control
The first election to the council was held in 1973, initially operating as a shadow authority before coming into its powers on 1 April 1974. Since 1973 political control of the council has been held by the following parties:

Leadership
The leaders of the council since 2003 have been:

Council elections
1973 Hinckley and Bosworth Borough Council election
1976 Hinckley and Bosworth Borough Council election
1979 Hinckley and Bosworth Borough Council election
1983 Hinckley and Bosworth Borough Council election (New ward boundaries)
1984 Hinckley and Bosworth Borough Council election
1986 Hinckley and Bosworth Borough Council election (Borough boundary changes took place but the number of seats remained the same)
1987 Hinckley and Bosworth Borough Council election
1991 Hinckley and Bosworth Borough Council election (Borough boundary changes took place but the number of seats remained the same)
1995 Hinckley and Bosworth Borough Council election
1999 Hinckley and Bosworth Borough Council election
2003 Hinckley and Bosworth Borough Council election (New ward boundaries)
2007 Hinckley and Bosworth Borough Council election
2011 Hinckley and Bosworth Borough Council election
2015 Hinckley and Bosworth Borough Council election
2019 Hinckley and Bosworth Borough Council election

Election results

By-election results

1995-1999

1999-2003

2003-2007

2007-2011

2015-2019

References

External links
Hinckley and Bosworth Borough Council

 
Hinckley and Bosworth
Council elections in Leicestershire
District council elections in England